Serine/threonine-protein kinase LMTK2 also known as Lemur tyrosine kinase 2 (LMTK2) is an enzyme that in humans is encoded by the LMTK2 gene.

Function 

The LMTK2 enzyme belongs to both the protein kinase and the tyrosine kinase families. It contains N-terminus transmembrane helices and a long C-terminal cytoplasmic tail with serine/threonine kinase activity.  This protein interacts with several other proteins, such as androgen receptor, inhibitor-2 (Inh2), protein phosphatase-1 (PP1C), p35, and myosin VI. It phosphorylates other proteins, and is itself also phosphorylated when interacting with cyclin-dependent kinase 5 (cdk5)/p35 complex. This protein is involved in nerve growth factor (NGF)-TrkA signalling, and also plays a critical role in endosomal membrane trafficking. Mouse studies suggested an essential role of this protein in spermatogenesis.

Clinical significance 

Loss of LMTK2 has been implicated to play a role in development of prostate cancer.

Interactions 

LMTK2 has been shown to interact with PPP1CA, Cyclin-dependent kinase 5 and PPP1R2.

References

Further reading